Simone Palermo (born 17 August 1988) is an Italian footballer who plays as a midfielder for Viterbese at Serie C.

Biography
Palermo started his career at hometown club A.S. Roma, where he received Italian youth teams call-up since 2003. He signed a youth contract until June 2008 in March 2006. In July 2007 he joined Rimini on loan with option to purchase, as part of Ahmed Barusso deal to Roma. On 30 January 2008, Palermo returned to Roma. On 1 September 2008, he joined Serie B side in co-ownership deal and cost Treviso a peppercorn of €500. Palermo left for A.C. Pistoiese of Lega Pro Prima Divisione on loan in January.

In June 2009, after the bankrupt of Treviso, Palermo became a free agent and on 1 February 2010 joined Prima Divisione side Pro Patria.

In August 2010 he signed a 1+2 year contract with Foggia.

On 5 November 2011 he signed a contract with Piacenza. In 2012, he joined Gubbio.

Cremonese 
Cremonese signed Palermo in co-ownership deal from Parma for €100,000 and Massimo Loviso in temporary deal on 15 July 2013. Parma acquired Palermo from Gubbio for €70,000 (including other costs).

International career
Palermo capped for Italy at 2005 UEFA European Under-17 Football Championship (5 games) and 2005 FIFA U-17 World Championship (3 games). He also played 5 friendlies for U17.

References

External links
 Foggia Profile 
Profile at Roma (2008–09) 

Profile at FIGC 

1988 births
Living people
Italian footballers
Italy youth international footballers
A.S. Roma players
Rimini F.C. 1912 players
Treviso F.B.C. 1993 players
U.S. Pistoiese 1921 players
Aurora Pro Patria 1919 players
Calcio Foggia 1920 players
Piacenza Calcio 1919 players
A.S. Gubbio 1910 players
U.S. Cremonese players
Virtus Entella players
Ravenna F.C. players
Serie B players
Serie C players
Association football midfielders
Footballers from Rome